Calliostoma altena is a species of sea snail, a marine gastropod mollusk in the family Calliostomatidae.

Description

Distribution
This marine species occurs in the Makassar Strait, Indonesia, at depths more than 900 m.

References

External links

altena
Gastropods described in 1970